Leander (Franz) Czerny (4 October 1859, Modřice, Moravia – 22 November 1944, Pettenbach, Upper Austria) was an Austrian entomologist mainly interested in Diptera.

Biography
Czerny, who wrote extensively on Diptera between 1900 and 1939, describing many genera and species, was a major contributor to Erwin Lindner's Die Fliegen der paläarktischen Region ("The Flies of the Palaearctic Region"), the most significant work on the group in the 20th century. 

Czerny wrote the sections on the following families:-
 Heleomyzidae, Trichoscelidae, Chyromyidae (1927)
 Anthomyzidae, Opomyzidae, Tethinidae, Clusiidae (1928)
 Micropezidae (Tylidae), Neridrinae, Platypezidae (as Clythiidae), Dryomyzidae, Neottiophilidae (1930)
 Lauxaniidae (Sapromyzidae) (1932)
 Musidoridae (Lonchopteridae), Lonchaeidae (1934)
 Chamaemyiidae (Ochthiphilidae) (1936)

He was also abbot of the Benedictine Kremsmünster Abbey from 1905 to 1929 and collected there as well as in Pettenbach on the Upper Danube. As well as Diptera he collected Lepidoptera. His collections of both are now in the Natural History Museum in Vienna.

External links 
  Biography
  Biography and list of publications
 Czech and Slovak Dipterological Literature 1758-1965
 BHL Spanische Dipteren Spanische Dipteren. Gesammelt und bearbeitet von Prof. Gabriel Strobl in Admont. VII. Theil.. 1898-1909 Volume 3
 Spanische Dipteren Volume 7

1859 births
1944 deaths
People from Modřice
Austrian biologists
Austrian entomologists
Dipterists
Austrian abbots
Austrian Benedictines
Moravian-German people
Austrian people of Moravian-German descent
Austrian people of Czech descent